was a town located in Kami District, Kōchi Prefecture, Japan.

As of 2003, the town had an estimated population of 3,382 and a density of 2,062.20 persons per km². The total area was 1.64 km².

On March 1, 2006, Akaoka, along with the towns of Kagami, Noichi and Yasu, and the village of Yoshikawa (all from Kami District), was merged to create the city of Kōnan and no longer exists as an independent municipality.

Dissolved municipalities of Kōchi Prefecture
Kōnan, Kōchi